The Woolwich East by-election of 14 June 1951 was held after the death of Labour MP Ernest Bevin. The seat was safe, having been won at the 1950 United Kingdom general election by over 12,000 votes

The by-election was easily won by Labour's Christopher Mayhew.

Result of the previous general election

Result of the by-election

References

Woolwich East by-election
Woolwich East,1951
Woolwich
Woolwich East by-election
Woolwich East,1951
Woolwich East by-election